Carfagno is a surname. Notable people with the surname include:

 Edward Carfagno (1907–1996), American art director
 Jen Carfagno (born 1979), American television meteorologist

See also
 Carfagna